Norma Judith Torres (née Barillas ; born April 4, 1965) is an American politician. She is a member of the United States House of Representatives for California's 35th congressional district. Previously, she was a member of the California State Senate representing the 35th district. She is a member of the Democratic Party.

Early life and career
Torres was born Norma Judith Barillas in Guatemala. When she was five, she and her uncle came to the United States; her mother died a year later. She originally arrived on a tourist visa, but became a legal resident in her teens and gained citizenship in 1992.

Torres worked as a 9-1-1 dispatcher, and in 1994 led a campaign to require the hiring of bilingual 9-1-1 operators. She was an active member of AFSCME, serving as local 3090's shop steward. She served on the Pomona city council before being elected the city's mayor in 2006. In 2008, Torres endorsed then-presidential candidate Barack Obama before Hillary Clinton withdrew from the race, and was a superdelegate to the Democratic National Convention. She was elected to the State Assembly in November 2008, filling the vacancy left by former legislator Nell Soto, who retired. She earned her bachelor's degree in labor studies from the now defunct National Labor College in Maryland in 2012.

U.S. House of Representatives
Torres was elected to the U.S. House of Representative for California's 35th congressional district in 2014, defeating Christina Gagnier (D) with 63.5% of the vote. She was reelected in 2016, defeating Tyler Fischella (R) with 72.4% of the vote. In 2018, Torres received 69.4% of the vote to defeat Christian Valiente (R), and in 2020, she defeated Republican Mark Cargile with 69.3%.

After being reelected to the House in November 2022, Torres accused President Nayib Bukele of El Salvador of interfering in her race. Bukele had urged voters to oppose Torres.

Committee assignments
 United States House Committee on Appropriations
 Subcommittee on Transportation, and Housing and Urban Development, and Related Agencies
 Subcommittee on State, Foreign Operations, and Related Programs
 Subcommittee on Financial Services and General Government
 United States House Committee on Rules

Caucus memberships
 New Democrat Coalition
 Congressional Hispanic Caucus
 Congressional NextGen 9-1-1 Caucus

Political positions

Abortion
As of 2022, Torres has a 100% rating from NARAL Pro-Choice America and an F rating from the Susan B. Anthony List for her abortion-related voting record. She opposed the overturning of Roe v. Wade, calling it "devastating" and saying it set back "our country decades, reversing so many years of hard-fought progress" for women.

Big Tech
In 2022, Torres was one of 16 Democrats to vote against the Merger Filing Fee Modernization Act of 2021, an antitrust package that would crack down on corporations for anti-competitive behavior.

Personal life
Torres is married to Louis Torres. They live in Pomona, California. They have three children, all sons, including Robert Torres, a Pomona City Council member.

See also 

 List of Hispanic and Latino Americans in the United States Congress
 Women in the United States House of Representatives

References

External links

 Congresswoman Norma Torres official U.S. House website
 Norma Torres for Congress campaign website
 
 

|-

1965 births
21st-century American politicians
21st-century American women politicians
American politicians of Guatemalan descent
California city council members
Democratic Party California state senators
Dispatchers
Female members of the United States House of Representatives
Guatemalan emigrants to the United States
Hispanic and Latino American mayors in California
Hispanic and Latino American members of the United States Congress
Hispanic and Latino American state legislators in California
Hispanic and Latino American women in politics
Living people
Los Angeles Police Department officers
Mayors of places in California
Democratic Party members of the California State Assembly
Democratic Party members of the United States House of Representatives from California
National Labor College people
People from Escuintla Department
People from Pomona, California
People with acquired American citizenship
Women state legislators in California
Women mayors of places in California